The Gan River (Gan: Kōm-kong) runs north through the western part of Jiangxi before flowing into Lake Poyang and thus the Yangtze River. The Xiang-Gan uplands separate it from the Xiang River of neighboring eastern Hunan.

Two similarly sized rivers, the Gong River which is the southern tributary and the Mei River from the north combine in Yudu County, Jiangxi, to form the Gan. The Gan River flows  before splitting into distributaries just north of Nanchang. The Gan River is the major geographical feature of Jiangxi, and gives its name to the Gan variety of Chinese as well as the province's one-character abbreviation.

The river feeds into Lake Poyang, which in turns connects with the Yangtze.

See also
List of rivers in China
2010 South China floods

References

External links
 

Rivers of Jiangxi
Tributaries of the Yangtze River